The 3rd Alpine Division "Julia" was a division of the Royal Italian Army during World War II, which specialized in mountain warfare. The Alpini that formed the divisions are a highly decorated, elite mountain corps of the Italian Army comprising both infantry and artillery units. Today the traditions and name of the 3rd Alpine Division "Julia" are carried on by the Alpine Brigade "Julia".

History 
The division's lineage begins with the III Alpine Brigade formed in Udine on 11 March 1926 with the 8th Alpini Regiment in Udine and 9th Alpini Regiment in Gorizia and the 3rd Mountain Artillery Regiment in Belluno. On 27 October 1934 the brigade changed its name to 3rd Superior Alpine Command, which received the name Julio in December of the same year.

On 10 September 1935 the III Superior Alpine Command "Julio" was reformed as 3rd Alpine Division "Julia" with the 7th, 8th, and 9th Alpini regiments and the 3rd Alpine Artillery Regiment. On 25 December 1935 the 7th Alpini Regiment, Alpine Artillery Group "Belluno", and one battery of the Alpine Artillery Group "Conegliano" were transferred to the newly raised 5th Alpine Division "Pusteria" on a temporary basis for the Second Italo-Ethiopian War. However when the Pusteria returned from the war these transfers became permanent and the Julia also ceded the Alpini Battalion Bassano to the Pusteria.

World War II 
The division participated in the Italian invasion of Albania in April 1939 and remained in Kukës in north-western Albania afterwards. In October 1940 the division moved to the border with Greece for the Greco-Italian War.

Greco-Italian War 
The division participated in the Greco-Italian War, entering action on 28 October 1940 in the Battle of Pindus, where it suffered heavy casualties. The division remained in line until 10 November, when it was withdrawn for reorganization, but after only four days it had to go into battle again, in the Perat sector, where it sustained heavy Greek attacks until 8 December. On 23 December the division was again attacked by the Greeks; the attack lasted until 31 December and forced the Julia to retreat to Mali Qarishta, after heavy combat in extreme weather conditions. On 8 January 1941 a Greek offensive in the Berat sector hit the Julia hard; on the following day the division had to retreat to Mali Tabajan, and by 21 January the division was down to a single regiment with three understrength battalions. The remains of the Julia were withdrawn to the Hani Bubesit area and then transferred to Mavrovo, near Vlorë, where the division was reformed. At the end of February the division, now 10,500 strong, was sent again to the first line; on 24 February it was deployed on Mount Golico and the Zagorias Valley. On 28 February a new battle was fought in the Tepelenë sector; the Julia, as the last Italian unit defending the town, was attacked by the 2nd Greek Division in the Dragoti area, but managed to hold the front while suffering heavy casualties. On 7 March the Greeks attacked on Mount Golico, and two days later they renewed their attack, causing heavy losses; by 11 March the Greek offensive ended without taking Tepelenë, and both the Julia and the two Greek Divisions involved in the attack (the 2nd and the 17th) were worn out by the heavy fighting and losses. In April 1941, following the German intervention and the fall of Greece, the division was transferred to the Corinth Canal area and occupied the Peloponnese. During the Greco-Italian War the division had suffered overall 9,317 casualties: 49 officers and 1,625 soldiers during October-November 1940, 153 officers and 3,644 soldiers between December 1940 and January 1941, and 116 officers and 3,730 soldiers between February and April 1941.

Soviet Union 
The division remained in Greece on garrison duty until March 1942, when it was repatriated to Italy in preparation of its transfer to the Eastern Front as part of the Italian Army in Russia. On 28 March one of the troopships carrying the division back to Italy, the SS Galilea, was torpedoed and sunk by a submarine with the loss of 600 men from the Battalion "Gemona". The division's strength was increased to 16,000 men and on 14 July 1942 the Julia began its transfer to the Soviet Union. The Julia formed, together with the 2nd Alpine Division "Tridentina" and the 4th Alpine Division "Cuneense", the Alpine Army Corps.

By 25 September 1942 the division was deployed on the Don river between Kuvshin and Karawut. On 12 December 1942 the Red Army's Operation Little Saturn commenced, which in its first stage attacked and encircled the Italian Army in Russia's II Army Corps and XXXV Army Corps. On 13 January 1943, the Red Army launched the second stage of Operation Little Saturn: four armies of General Filipp Golikov's Voronezh Front attacked, encircled, and destroyed the Hungarian Second Army near Svoboda on the Don to the northwest of the Alpine Army Corps and pushed back the remaining units of the German XXIV Army Corps on the Alpine Army Corps' left flank, thus encircling the Alpine Army Corps.

On the evening of 17 January, the Alpine Army Corps commander, General Gabriele Nasci, ordered a full retreat. At this point only the Tridentina division was still capable of conducting effective combat operations. The 40,000-strong mass of stragglers — Alpini and Italians from other commands, plus German and Hungarian Hussars — formed two columns that followed the Tridentina division which, supported by a handful of German armored vehicles, led the way westwards to the Axis lines. On 1 February 1943 the remnants of the Alpine Army Corps reached Axis lines. The Julia suffered heavy losses in the breakout: less than a tenth of the Julia survived (approximately 1,200 survivors of 18,000 troops deployed).

Return to Italy 
The remnants of the division were repatriated in May 1943 and the division was reformed on 1 May 1943 with troops of the 1st Alpini "Valley" Group of the 6th Alpine Division "Alpi Graie". After the announcement of the Armistice of Cassibile on 8 September 1943 the invading German forces disbanded the division.

Organization 
When the division was deployed to the Soviet Union it consisted of the following units:

  3rd Alpine Division "Julia", in Udine
  8th Alpini Regiment, in Udine
  Command and Command Company
  Alpini Battalion "Gemona"
  Command Company
  69th, 70th, and 71st Alpini companies
  116th Support Weapons Company (Breda M37 machine guns, 45mm Mod. 35 and 81mm Mod. 35 mortars)
  Alpini Battalion "Tolmezzo"
  Command Company
  6th, 12th, and 72nd Alpini companies
  114th Support Weapons Company (Breda M37 machine guns, 45mm Mod. 35 and 81mm Mod. 35 mortars)
  Alpini Battalion "Cividale"
  Command Company
  16th, 20th, and 76th Alpini companies
  115th Support Weapons Company (Breda M37 machine guns, 45mm Mod. 35 and 81mm Mod. 35 mortars)
  41st Anti-tank Company (47/32 anti-tank guns)
  8th Supply Squad
  28th Train Section (Logistic Support)
 308th Medical Section
 814th Field Hospital
  9th Alpini Regiment, in Gorizia
  Command and Command Company
  Alpini Battalion "L'Aquila"
  Command Company
  93rd, 108th, and 143rd Alpini companies
  119th Support Weapons Company (Breda M37 machine guns, 45mm Mod. 35 and 81mm Mod. 35 mortars)
  Alpini Battalion "Vicenza"
  Command Company
  59th, 60th, and 61st Alpini companies
  117th Support Weapons Company (Breda M37 machine guns, 45mm Mod. 35 and 81mm Mod. 35 mortars)
  Alpini Battalion "Bassano" (ceded to the 11th Alpini Regiment) on 25 September 1937)
  Alpini Battalion "Val Cismon" (transferred from the 7th Alpini Regiment) on 17 April 1941)
  Command Company
  264th, 265th, and 277th Alpini companies
  118th Support Weapons Company (Breda M37 machine guns, 45mm Mod. 35 and 81mm Mod. 35 mortars)
  83rd Anti-tank Company (47/32 anti-tank guns)
  9th Supply Squad
  919th Train Section (Logistic Support)
 309th Medical Section
 630th Field Hospital
  3rd Alpine Artillery Regiment, in Udine
  Command and Command Unit
  Alpine Artillery Group "Conegliano" (75/13 mountain guns)
  13th Battery
  14th Battery
  15th Battery
  Ammunition and Supply Unit
  Alpine Artillery Group "Udine" (75/13 mountain guns)
  17th Battery
  18th Battery
  34th Battery
  Ammunition and Supply Unit
  Alpine Artillery Group "Val Piave" (reserve unit raised in 1942 for the campaign in the Soviet Union; 105/11 mountain guns)
  35th Battery
  36th Battery
  Ammunition and Supply Unit
  45th Anti-aircraft Battery (20/65 Mod. 35 anti-aircraft guns)
  47th Anti-aircraft Battery (20/65 Mod. 35 anti-aircraft guns)
  77th Anti-tank Battery (attached unit for the campaign in the Soviet Union, 75/39 anti-tank guns)
  III Mixed Alpine Engineer Battalion
  Command Platoon
  103rd Searchlight Section
  113th Telegraph and Radio Operators Company
  123rd Engineer Company
  8th Train Unit
  3rd Alpine Division Command Transport Squad
  62nd Bakers Section
  111th Supply Section
 207th Transport Section
 127th Mixed Transport Platoon
 725th Heavy Transport Platoon
 726th Heavy Transport Platoon
 950th Heavy Transport Platoon
 237th Transport Section
 303rd Medical Section
 628th Field Hospital
 629th Field Hospital
 633rd Field Hospital
 813th Field Hospital
 415th Carabinieri Section
 416th Carabinieri Section
 202nd Field Post Office

The division strength was 573 officers and 16,887 NCOs and soldiers for a total strength of 17,460 men. The division also had 176 horses, 4,698 mules and 584 transport vehicles at its disposal.

Military honors 
For their conduct during the Greco-Italian War and during the Italian campaign in the Soviet Union the President of Italy awarded on to the three regiments of the 3rd Alpine Division "Julia" Italy's highest military honor, the Gold Medal of Military Valour. This makes the 3rd Alpine Division "Julia" together with the 3rd Cavalry Division "Principe Amedeo Duca d'Aosta" the two highest decorated Italian divisions of World War II.

Greco-Italian War:
  8th Alpini Regiment on 30 January 1948
  9th Alpini Regiment on 30 January 1948
  3rd Alpine Artillery Regiment on 8 February 1945

Italian participation in the Eastern Front|Italian campaign in the Soviet Union:
  8th Alpini Regiment on 31 December 1947
  9th Alpini Regiment on 31 December 1947
  3rd Alpine Artillery Regiment on 31 December 1947

Commanding officers 
The division's commanding officers were:

 Generale di Divisione Carlo Rossi (1935 - 1 September 1938)
 Generale di Divisione Fedele De Giorgis (2 September 1938 - 6 August 1940)
 Colonel Gaetano Tavoni (acting, 7 August 1940 - 21 September 1940)
 Generale di Divisione Mario Girotti (22 September 1940 - 10 September 1941)
 Generale di Divisione Umberto Ricagno (11 September 1941 - May 1943)
 Generale di Divisione Franco Testi (16 May 1943 - 12 September 1943)

See also
 Italian Army in Russia
 Alpine Brigade "Julia"

References 

Alpini divisions of Italy
Divisions of Italy in World War II
Italian military units and formations of the Greco-Italian War
Military units and formations established in 1935
Military units and formations disestablished in 1943